Mathilde de Kerangat (born 14 October 1991) is a French sailor. She placed 21st in the Laser Radial event at the 2016 Summer Olympics.

References

External links 
 
 
 
 
 

1991 births
Living people
French female sailors (sport)
Olympic sailors of France
Sailors at the 2016 Summer Olympics – Laser Radial
Universiade bronze medalists for France
Universiade medalists in sailing
21st-century French women